Ampelocissus acetosa is a species of vine. Common names include wild grape and djabaru.

It occurs naturally in New Guinea as well as tropical parts of Western Australia, the Northern Territory and Queensland in Australia.

References

acetosa
Flora of the Northern Territory
Flora of Queensland
Rosids of Western Australia
Plants described in 1859
Taxa named by Ferdinand von Mueller